Fehr is a German surname, most prevalent in the German speaking portion of Switzerland. Notable people with the surname include:

Adolf Fehr (field hockey) (1904–1992), Swiss field hockey player
Adolf Fehr (alpine skier) (born 1940), Liechtenstein alpine skier
Beat Fehr (1942–1967), Swiss racing driver
Brendan Fehr (born 1977), Canadian actor
Darcy Fehr (born 1974), Canadian actor
Donald Fehr (born 1948), American baseball and hockey official
Eric Fehr (born 1985), Canadian ice hockey player
Ernst Fehr (born 1956), Austrian economist
Hans-Jürg Fehr (born 1948), Swiss politician
Henry Charles Fehr (1867–1940), British sculptor
Jacqueline Fehr (born 1963), Swiss politician
Konrad Fehr (1910 - 1993), Swiss field hockey player
Mario Fehr (born 1958), Swiss politician
Oded Fehr (born 1970), Israeli actor
Oskar Fehr (1871–1959), German ophthalmologist
René Fehr (born 1942), Swiss painter
Richard Fehr (1939–2013), Swiss Christian minister
Rick Fehr (born 1962), American golfer
Rudi Fehr (1911–1999), American film editor

See also
Charles Fehr Round Barn
Fehr corneal dystrophy
Fahr

German-language surnames
Swiss-German surnames
Russian Mennonite surnames